László Szabó may refer to:

Sportspeople
 László Szabó (canoeist) (born 1953), Hungarian sprint canoer
 László Szabó (fencer), Hungarian fencing master
 László Szabó (footballer) (born 1989), Hungarian football defender
 László Szabó (handballer, born 1946), Hungarian handball player who competed in the 1972 Olympics
 László Szabó (handballer, born 1955) (1955–2017), Hungarian handball player who competed in the 1980 and 1988 Olympics
 László Szabó (motorcyclist) (1934 - 2020), Hungarian former Grand Prix motorcycle road racer
 László Szabó (rower) (1908–1992), Hungarian Olympic rower
 László Szabó (wrestler, born 1946) (born 1946), Hungarian former wrestler
 László Szabó (wrestler, born 1991) (born 1991), Hungarian wrestler

Other people
 László Szabó (actor) (born 1936), Hungarian actor, film director and screenwriter
 László Szabó (chess player) (1917–1998), Hungarian chess grandmaster
 László Szabó (diplomat) (born 1965), Hungarian diplomat and politician
 László Szabó (linguist) (1922–2008), Hungarian-Canadian linguist
 László Rác Szabó (born 1957), ethnic Hungarian politician in Serbia
 Lajos Szabó a founder of the Budapest Dialogical School

See also 
 Szabó